This is a non-fiction bibliography of works about the Napoleonic Wars as selected by editors.

General
 Bruce, Robert B.; Dickie, Iain; Kiley, Kevin; Pavkovic, Michael F.; Schneid, Frederick C. (2008). Fighting Techniques of the Napoleonic Age 1792~1815. London: Amber Books. .
 Chandler, David G. (1966). The Campaigns of Napoleon. New York: Macmillan. .
 Chandler, David G. (1979). Dictionary of the Napoleonic Wars. New York: Macmillan. .
 Chandler, David G. (1987) [First published 1831]. The Military Maxims of Napoleon. London: Greenhill Books. .
 Chandler, David G. (1990). The Illustrated Napoleon. London: Greenhill. .
 Chandler, David G. (1994). On the Napoleonic Wars. London: Greenhill Books. .
 Esposito, Brigadier General Vincent J.; Elting, Colonel John R. (1999) [First published 1964]. A Military History and Atlas of the Napoleonic Wars (New ed.). London: Greenhill Books. .
 Fremont, Gregory-Barnes, ed. (2006). The Encyclopedia of the French Revolutionary and Napoleonic Wars. Santa Barbara, CA: ABC-CLIO. .
 Glover, Michael (1980) [First published 1979]. The Napoleonic Wars: an illustrated history 1792–1815. London: Book Club Associates. .
 Haythornthwaite, Philip J. (1990). The Napoleonic Source Book. London: Cassell & Co. .
 Herold, J. Christopher (2002) [First published 1963]. The Age of Napoleon. London: Weidenfeld & Nicolson. .
 Hodge, Carl Cavanagh, ed. (2008). Encyclopedia of the Age of Imperialism, 1800–1914. Vols. 1 & 2. Westport, CT: Greenwood Press. .
 Jaques, Tony (2006). Dictionary of Battles and Sieges. Santa Barbara, CA: Greenwood Publishing Group. .
 Konstam, Angus (2003). Historical Atlas of the Napoleonic Era. London: Mercury Books. .
 McNab, Chris, ed. (2011) [First published 2009]. Armies of the Napoleonic Wars. Oxford: Osprey Publishing. .
 Mikaberidze, Alexander (2020). The Napoleonic Wars: A Global History. Oxford University Press.
 Nosworthy, Brent (1995). Battle Tactics of Napoleon and His Enemies. London: Constable and Company. .
 Over, Keith (1976). Flags and Standards of the Napoleonic Wars. London: Bivouc Books. .
 Pivka, Otto von (1979). Armies of the Napoleonic Era. Newton Abbot, UK: David & Charles. .
 Riley, Jonathon P. (2000). Napoleon and the World War of 1813: Lessons in Coalition Warfighting. London: Routledge. .

 Roberts, Andrew (2001). Napoleon and Wellington. London: Weidenfeld & Nicolson. .
 Rose, J. Holland (1935) [First published 1894]. The Revolutionary and Napoleonic Era 1789–1815 (7th ed.). Cambridge: Cambridge University Press.
 Rothenberg, Gunther E. (1977). The Art of Warfare in the Age of Napoleon. London: B.T. Batsford. .
 Rothenberg, Gunther E. (1999). Keegan, John. ed. The Napoleonic Wars. London: Cassell & Co. .
 Smith, Digby (1998). The Greenhill Napoleonic Wars Data Book. London: Greenhill Books. .
 Taylor, Brian (2006). The Empire of the French. Stroud, UK: Spellmount. .
 Wellesley, Arthur (1837–1839). Gurwood, John. ed. The dispatches of Field Marshal the Duke of Wellington: During his various campaigns in India, Denmark, Portugal, Spain, the Low Countries, and France, from 1799 to 1818. Vols. I–XII. London: John Murray.

Battles
 Adkin, Mark (2001). The Waterloo Companion: The Complete Guide to History's Most Famous Land Battle. London: Aurum Press. .
 Ayrton, Michael; Taylor, John (2008). The Sharpest Fight: The 95th Rifles at Tarbes, 20th March 1814. London: Forbitou Books. .
 Barbero, Alessandro (2005). The Battle: A New History Of Waterloo. Walker & Company. .
 Chandler, David G. (1993) [First published 1980]. Waterloo: The Hundred Days. London: Osprey. .
 Chartrand, René (2001). Vimeiro 1808. Oxford: Osprey Publishing. .
 Chartrand, René (2001). Bussaco 1810. Oxford: Osprey Publishing. .
 Chartrand, René (2001). Fuentes de Oñoro 1811. Oxford: Osprey Publishing. .
 Duffy, Christopher (1999) [First published 1972]. Borodino and the War of 1812. London: Cassell & Co. .
 Duffy, Christopher (1999) [First published 1977]. Austerlitz 1805. London: Cassell & Co. .
 Fletcher, Ian; Younghusband, Tony (1997). Salamanca 1812. Oxford: Osprey Publishing. .
 Fletcher, Ian (1996). Vittoria 1813. Oxford: Osprey Publishing. .
 Haythornthwaite, Philip J. (1996). Die Hard!. London: Arms & Armour Press. .
 Hibbert, Christopher (1998). Waterloo. Ware, UK: Wordsworth Editions. .
 Howarth, David (1997) [First published 1968]. Waterloo: A Near Run Thing (Reissued 2003 ed.). London: Phoenix. .
 Mikaberidze, Alexander (2007). The Battle of Borodino: napoleon versus Kutuzov. Barnsley: Pen&Sword.
 Mikaberidze, Alexander (2010). The Battle of the Berezina: Napoleon's Great Escape. Barnsley: Pen&Sword.
 Muir, Rory (2000). Tactics and the Experience of Battle in the Age of Napoleon. London: Yale University Press. .
 Sutherland, Jonathan (2003). Napoleonic Battles. Shrewsbury, UK: Airlife. .
 Uffindell, Andrew (2003). Great Generals of the Napoleonic Wars and their Battles 1805–1815. Staplehurst, UK: Spellmount. .

Biographies
 Asprey, Robert (2000). The Rise and Fall of Napoleon Bonaparte: Volume I – The Rise. London: Abacus. .
 Asprey, Robert (2001). The Rise and Fall of Napoleon Bonaparte: Volume II – The Fall. London: Abacus. .
 Chandler, David G., ed. (1987). Napoleon's Marshals. London: Weidenfeld & Nicolson. .
 Chandler, David G. (2002) [First published 1973]. Napoleon. Barnsley, UK: Leo Cooper. .
 Barnett, Correlli (1997). Bonaparte. Ware, UK: Wordsworth Editions. .
 Cornwall, James-Marshall (1998). Napoleon: As Military Commander. New York: Barnes & Noble Books. .
 Corrigan, Gordon (2006) [First published 2001]. Wellington: A Military Life. London: Hambledon Continuum. .
 Cronin, Vincent (1973). Napoleon. Harmondsworth, UK: Pelican Books. .
 Dwyer, Philip (2007). Napoleon: The Path to Power 1769–1799. London: Bloomsbury. .
 Dywer, Philip (2013). Citizen Emperor: Napoleon in Power 1799–1815. London: Bloomsbury. .
 Ellis, Geoffrey (1996). Napoleon (Profiles in Power). Harlow, UK: Longman. .
 Englund, Steven (2004). Napoleon: A Political Life. Harvard: University Press. .
 Falk, Avner (2007). Napoleon Against Himself: A Psychobiography.  Charlottesville, VA: Pitchstone Publishing. .
 Fournier, August [First published 1903]. Napoleon the First: A Biography. New York: Henry Holt And Company. .
 Holmes, Richard (2007) [First published 2003]. Wellington The Iron Duke. London: HarperCollins. .
 Longford, Elizabeth (1969). Wellington: The Years of The Sword. London: Weidenfeld & Nicolson. .
 Longford, Elizabeth (1992) [1969/72]. Wellington (abridged ed.). London: Weidenfeld & Nicolson. .
 Roberts, Andrew (2014). Napoleon: A Life.
 Six, Georges (1934) Dictionnaire biographique des généraux et amiraux français de la Révolution et de l'Empire: 1792-1814. Paris, Librairie Historique et Nobiliare. Tome I (A–J) Tome II (K–Z) (in French)
 Zamoyski Adam (2018). Napoleon: A Life.

Campaigns
 Gill, John H. (2018). With Eagles to Glory: Napoleon and his German Allies in the 1809 Campaign.
 Lieven, Dominic (2010). Russia Against Napoleon: The True Story of the Campaigns of War and Peace.
 Nafziger, George (2009). Napoleon's Invasion of Russia.
 Zamoyski, Adam (2004). 1812: Napoleon’s Fatal March on Moscow: Napoleon's Fatal March on Moscow.

Forces
 Haythornthwaite, Philip J. (2001). Napoleonic Infantry. London: Cassell & Co. .
 Haythornthwaite, Philip J. (2001). Napoleonic Cavalry. London: Cassell & Co. .

British
 Bluth, B.J. (2003). Marching With Sharpe. London: HarperCollins. .
 Fletcher, Ian (2000) [First Published 1996]. Napoleonic Wars: Wellington's Army. London: Brassey's Military Books. .
 Fletcher, Ian (2005) [First published 1994]. Wellington's Regiments: The Men and their Battles 1808–1815. Staplehurst, UK: Spellmount. .
 Fletcher, Ian; Poulter, Ron (1992). Gentlemen's Sons. Tunbridge Wells, UK: Spellmount. .
 Harrison, Keith; Smith, Eric (2008). Rifle-Green by Nature: A Regency Naturalist and his Family, William Elford Leach. London: The Ray Society. . (actions of the 95th Rifles)
 Haythornthwaite, Philip J. (1996) [First published 1987]. British Infantry of the Napoleonic Wars. London: Arms & Armour Press. .
 Haythornthwaite, Philip J. (1997) [First published 1989]. Wellington's Military Machine. Staplehurst, UK: Spellmount. .
 Haythornthwaite, Philip J. (1998) [First published 1994]. The Armies of Wellington. London: Arms & Armour Press. .
 Holmes, Richard (2001). Redcoat. London: HarperCollins. .
 
 Morgan, Matthew (2004). Wellington's Victories: A Guide to Sharpe's Army. London: Andrews McMeel Publishing. .
 Reid, Stuart (2004). Wellington's Army in the Peninsular 1809–14. Oxford: Osprey Publishing. .
 Urban, Mark (2004) [2003]. Rifles. London: Faber and Faber. .

French
 Chartrand, René (2000) [First Published 1996]. Napoleonic Wars: Napoleon's Army. London: Brassey's Military Books. .
 Blond, Georges (1995) [First published 1979]. La Grande Armée. Translated by Marshall May. London: Arms & Armour Press. .
 Elting, John R. (1988). Swords Around a Throne: Napoleon's Grande Armée. London: Weidenfeld & Nicolson. .
 Griffith, Paddy (2007). French Napoleonic Infantry Tactics 1792–1815. Oxford: Osprey Publishing. .
 Haythornthwaite, Philip J. (1995) [First published 1988]. Napoleon's Military Machine. Staplehurst, UK: Spellmount. .
 Smith, Digby (2000). Napoleon's Regiments. London: Greenhill Books. .

Prussian
 Schmidt, Oliver (2003). Prussian Regular Infantryman 1808–15. Oxford: Osprey Publishing. .
 Pivka, Otto von (1973). The Black Brunswickers. Oxford: Osprey Publishing. .
 Young, Peter (1973). Blücher's Army 1813–1815. Oxford: Osprey Publishing. .

Uniforms and equipment
 Haythornthwaite, Philip J. (1998). Weapons & Equipment of the Napoleonic Wars. London: Arms & Armour Press. .
 Over, Keith (1976). Flags and Standards of the Napoleonic Wars. London: Bivouac Books. .
 Smith, Digby (2006). An Illustrated Encyclopedia of Uniforms of the Napoleonic Wars. London: Lorenz Books. .
 Windrow, Martin; Embleton, Gerry (1974). Military Dress of the Peninsular War 1804–1814. New York: Hippocrene Books. .

Naval
 Adkin, Mark (2005). The Trafalgar Companion: The Complete Guide to History's Most Famous Sea Battle and the Life of Admiral Lord Nelson. London: Aurum Press. .
 Davies, David (1996). Fighting Ships: Ships of the Line 1793–1815. London: Constable. .
 Davies, Paul (1972). The Battle of Trafalgar. London: Pan Books. .
 Fitchett, W.H. (2007). Naval Battles of the Napoleonic Wars. UK: Leonaur. .
 Fremont, Gregory-Barnes (2007). The Royal Navy 1793–1815. Oxford: Osprey Publishing. .
 Goodwin, Peter (2002). Nelson's Ships: A History of the Vessels in Which He Served 1771–1805. London: Conway Maritime Press. .
 Lavery, Brian (1992) [First published 1989]. Nelson's Navy: The Ships, Men and Organisation 1793–1815. London: Conway Maritime Press. .
 Pivka, Otto von (1980). Navies of the Napoleonic Era. Newton Abbot, UK: David & Charles. .
 Warner, Oliver (1971) [First published 1965]. Nelson's Battles. Newton Abbot, UK: David & Charles. .
 White, Colin (2002). The Nelson Encyclopaedia. Rochester, UK: Chatham Publishing. .

Peninsular War
 Fletcher, Ian (2003). Fortresses of the Peninsular 1808–14. Oxford: Osprey Publishing. .
 Gates, David (2002) [First published 1986]. The Spanish Ulcer: A History of the Peninsular War. Pimlico. .
 Lachouque, Commandant Henry; Tranie, Jean; Carmigniani, J.-C. (1982) [First published 1978 in French]. Napoleon's War in Spain. London: Arms and Armour. .
 Napier, Sir William Francis Patrick (1835–40). History of the War in the Peninsula and in the South of France from the Year 1807 to the Year 1814. Vols. I–VI. London: Thomas & William Boone.
 Napier, Sir William Francis Patrick (1852). English Battles and Sieges in The Peninsula: Extracted from his 'Peninsula War. London: Chapman and Hall.
 Oman, Charles (1902–30). A History of the Peninsular War. Vols I–VII'''. Oxford: Clarendon Press.
 Parkinson, Roger (2000) [First published 1973]. The Peninsular War. Ware, UK: Wordsworth Editions. .
 
 Weller, Jac (1999) [First published 1963]. Wellington in the Peninsula. London: Greenhill Books. .

Invasion of Russia
 Smith, Digby (2002) [First published 1977]. Armies of 1812''. Staplehurst, UK: Spellmount. .

Napoleonic Wars
Napoleonic Wars
 
Works about Napoleon